Borys Borysovych Tashchy (born 26 July 1993) is a Ukrainian professional footballer who plays as a forward or attacking midfielder for German club Erzgebirge Aue.

Club career
Tashchy was born in Odesa. He was sold by his original club Chornomorets Odesa to the Latvian side JFK Olimps on 22 August 2011, and the very next day Olimps re-sold him to Dynamo Moscow. Dynamo's general director Roman Dyakov could not explain why they did not directly buy him from Chornomorets, citing confidentiality, and Serhiy Kernitsky, Chornomorets' vice-president was perplexed at this scheme as the transfer price given by Chornomorets would be the same for Dynamo as it was for Olimps.

VfB Stuttgart
On 9 October 2014, Tashchy moved to VfB Stuttgart II. He made his debut for VfB Stuttgart in the Bundesliga on 29 November 2015 against Borussia Dortmund. Stuttgart relegated from Bundesliga at the end of 2015–16 season, but Tashchy remain with the team for the next season. He scored his first official goal for the team on 22 August 2016 in a match against FC 08 Homburg for the DFB-Pokal.

Loan to FC Zbrojovka Brno
On 22 February 2017, Tashchy moved to FC Zbrojovka Brno on a half-year loan. In July 2017 he became a free agent after his contract with Stuttgart was terminated.

MSV Duisburg
On 4 July 2017, Tashchy moved to MSV Duisburg.

FC St. Pauli
For the 2019–20 season, he was signed by FC St. Pauli. He agreed the termination of his contract with the club in January 2021.

Pohang Steelers 
On 5 March. 2021 Tashchy moved to Pohang Steelers of K League 1. At the end of the season, he left the club through mutual consent.

International career
Tashchy represented Ukraine in all national selections from U16 to U21.

Due to his Bessarabian Bulgarian roots, in 2014 he received a Bulgarian passport making him eligible for the Bulgaria national football team. On 28 March 2016, Bulgarian media reported that Borys had already spoken with BFU officials and had expressed his desire to represent Bulgaria. Petev once again confirmed that Tashchy will play for Bulgaria on 27 May 2016, but he couldn't join the team for the Kirin Cup due to paper problems.

Career statistics

References

External links

1993 births
Living people
Ukrainian footballers
Ukraine under-21 international footballers
Ukraine youth international footballers
Ukrainian people of Bulgarian descent
Bessarabian Bulgarians
FC Dynamo Moscow reserves players
FC Chornomorets Odesa players
VfB Stuttgart II players
VfB Stuttgart players
FC Zbrojovka Brno players
MSV Duisburg players
FC St. Pauli players
Pohang Steelers players
FC Erzgebirge Aue players
Ukrainian Premier League players
Ukrainian First League players
Bundesliga players
2. Bundesliga players
3. Liga players
K League 1 players
Regionalliga players
Ukrainian expatriate footballers
Expatriate footballers in Russia
Expatriate footballers in Germany
Expatriate footballers in the Czech Republic
Expatriate footballers in South Korea
Ukrainian expatriate sportspeople in the Czech Republic
Ukrainian expatriate sportspeople in South Korea
Ukrainian expatriate sportspeople in Russia
Ukrainian expatriate sportspeople in Germany
Association football midfielders
Footballers from Odesa
Naturalised citizens of Bulgaria